George Lester Lincoln Linton (12 November 1956 – 14 August 2014) was a Barbadian cricketer. He played first-class cricket for Barbados from 1982 to 1990.

Linton was a leg-spin and googly bowler and lower-order batsman. His best bowling figures were 5 for 35 against Guyana in 1982-83, when he also scored 66. He was a youth coach for Barbados's National Sports Council for many years.

References

External links
 
 George Linton at CricketArchive

1956 births
2014 deaths
Barbadian cricketers
Barbados cricketers
Barbadian cricket coaches